Instituto Superior de Ciências da Saúde Egas Moniz (ISCSEM) is the largest private institute of learning in Portugal dedicated to higher studies in the medical field. Founded in 1987 it currently offers 15 degrees, from BsC to MsC.

Degrees 

Nutrition, Biomedical Science, Forensic Science, Criminal Psychology

Integrated Masters Degrees 

Pharmacy, Dentistry

See also
List of colleges and universities in Portugal

References 

Higher education in Portugal
1987 establishments in Portugal
Educational institutions established in 1987